John Borden Hamilton,  (May 16, 1913 – November 24, 2005) was a Canadian lawyer and Member of Parliament.

Born in Barrie, Ontario, he was first elected in a by-election in 1954 in the Toronto riding of York West as a Progressive Conservative. He was re-elected in 1957 and 1958. He lost to Red Kelly in 1962. From 1957 to 1958, he was the Parliamentary Assistant to the Minister of Citizenship and Immigration.

In 1992, he was made a Member of the Order of Canada. He is also a member of the Etobicoke Hall of Fame.

References
 

1913 births
2005 deaths
Lawyers in Ontario
Members of the House of Commons of Canada from Ontario
Members of the Order of Canada
People from Barrie
Progressive Conservative Party of Canada MPs